Arutyun Artakovich Grigoryan (born 19 May 1998) is a Russian football player. He plays for FC Arsenal Tula.

Career

Club career
He made his debut in the Russian Professional Football League for FC Krasnodar-2 on 9 April 2015 in a game against FC Astrakhan. He made his Russian Football National League debut for Krasnodar-2 on 29 July 2018 in a game against FC Mordovia Saransk.

On 3 January 2020 FC Krasnodar announced that he's been loaned to Czech club FK Mladá Boleslav until the end of 2020.

References

External links
 
 

1998 births
Russian sportspeople of Armenian descent
Armenian emigrants to Russia
Footballers from Gyumri
Living people
Russian footballers
Russian expatriate footballers
Association football wingers
Association football midfielders
FC Krasnodar players
FC Krasnodar-2 players
FK Mladá Boleslav players
FC Arsenal Tula players
Russian First League players
Russian Second League players
Russian expatriate sportspeople in the Czech Republic
Expatriate footballers in the Czech Republic